Matt Hall is an American politician from Michigan. Hall is a Republican member of Michigan House of Representatives from District 42.

Education 
In 2006, Hall earned a bachelor's degree in Business Management and Public Administration from Western Michigan University Haworth College of Business. In 2017, Hall earned a Juris Doctor degree from Western Michigan University Cooley Law School.

Career 
In 2005, Hall began his career as a legislative intern at Michigan House of Representatives. Hall was an External Affairs Representative for Michigan Department of State. Hall was the Field Director of Terri Lynn Land for Michigan Secretary of State.

In 2007, Hall became a Business Development Representative for L-3 Combat Propulsion Systems. From 2007 to 2009, Hall served as the Vice-chair for Michigan Republican Party.

Hall is an attorney. In 2011, Hall became the West Michigan Liaison for Michigan states's Office of the Attorney General.

On November 6, 2018, Hall won the election and became a Republican member of Michigan House of Representatives from District 63. Hall is the chairman of the Oversight Committee.

Personal life 
Hall has lived in Kalamazoo, Michigan and Grand Rapids, Michigan. Hall currently lives in Comstock Township, Michigan.

See also 
 2018 Michigan House of Representatives election

References

External links 
 Matt Hall at Ballotpedia
 Project Vote Smart – Representative Matt Hall (MI) profile
 Our Campaigns – Representative Matt Hall (MI) profile
 2018 General Election Results at mielections.us

|-

|-

21st-century American politicians
Living people
People from Grand Rapids, Michigan
People from Kalamazoo, Michigan
Republican Party members of the Michigan House of Representatives
Western Michigan University alumni
Year of birth missing (living people)